Borga Base was a semipermanent Antarctic research station operated by South Africa named after Borg Massif where it was located. It was created to house 4-5 people year-round and was 350 kilometers (220 miles) south of the location of South Africa's primary Antarctic research station, SANAE IV. Its main building was a Parcoll hut, a long hut with a semicircular frame resembling half a cylinder.

History 
Borga Base was created with the support of Belgian aircraft during the International Geophysical Year and was inaugurated in 1969. In the years of its operation, expedition teams would attempt the traverse from SANAE to Borga Base using specialized tractors, though they were not always successful. In 1969, mechanic Gordon Mackie was the first casualty of South African Antarctic research when he fell to his death on the traverse between the two bases. In 1970, mechanical and weather difficulties forced the team to abandon their attempt to reach Borga. In 1971, mechanical issues once again prevented the team from reaching Borga Base so they created Grunehogna, another semi-permanent station, using a prefabricated hut.

Research 
The main research activities of Borga Base were geological surveying and weather monitoring.

See also 

 List of Antarctic research stations
 List of Antarctic field camps

References